Brigadier General Manuel Nemesio Rodríguez Objío (Santo Domingo, 19 December 1838 – ibidem, 18 April 1871) was a poet, newspaper founder, historian, army general, politician, martyr, and National Hero of the Dominican Republic.

Early life and family
Objío was born in Santo Domingo on 19 December 1838 into a middle-class white family of Spanish heritage. His parents were Bernardina Objío Noble (1814–1893) and Andrés Rodríguez Rodríguez ( 1810–1843). The eldest of his siblings, he had one brother (Brigadier General Mariano Rodríguez Objío [1840–1913], a member of the Chamber of Deputies of the Dominican Republic) and two sisters.

Political and military life
In January 1855 Objío made a business trip to New York City; after his return to the Dominican Republic he settled in Azua, where he met President Pedro Santana who was fighting his rival General Buenaventura Báez and became his secretary.

Objío fought in the Cibao Revolution (1857–1858) that overthrew President Buenaventura Báez and re-installed Santana in the presidency.

Objío was among the firsts Dominicans that knew about President Santana's plan of annexate the Dominican Republic to Spain, and he sailed to Saint Thomas to meet exiled patriot Francisco del Rosario Sánchez to warn him. After the Dominican Restoration War (1863–1865) started, he met exiled Juan Pablo Duarte (Dominican Republic's foremost Founding Father) in Caracas, Venezuela, the both of them returned to the island in 1864 to fight Spaniards.

Between 1864 and 1868 he hold several political offices, including the ministries of Foreign Affairs, Education, and Justice; he also served as deputy to the 1865 Constituent Assembly and was elected deputy to the National Congress in 1867. He also served as President of the Council of War.

In March 1871, General Objío, General Segundo Imbert and others, commanded by Gregorio Luperón, publicly opposed and rebelled against President Buenaventura Báez's project of annexation of the Dominican Republic to the United States.

The rebellion failed and Objío was imprisoned at Ozama Fortress in Santo Domingo. Despite a plea for mercy by several prominent ladies of the city, Objío was executed by a firing squad on 18 April 1871.

Poetry and journalism

Rodríguez Objío founded the "La voz del Cibao" newspaper in Santiago, Dominican Republic.

Personal life
On 8 January 1861 Objío married María del Rosario Ravelo Prados, a white Dominican of Canarian descent; they had two daughters and one son.

He had another daughter with a woman named Rita Reyes.

Rodríguez Objío was fluent in French.

Descendants
Among his descendants can be highlighted:

Alejandro Grullón Espaillat (banker), great-grandson of Manuel Rodríguez Objío
Manuel Grullón Viñas (banker), son of the latter
 (banker), son of the latter
Ivonne Haza (soprano), great-granddaughter of Manuel Rodríguez Objío
Marcos Bisonó (businessman), son of Ivonne
Víctor Bisonó (politician), son of Ivonne
Oscar Haza (journalist), nephew of Ivonne Haza, great-great-grandson of Manuel Rodríguez Objío
Rita Indiana (singer, author and LGBT and feminist activist), grand-niece of Ivonne Haza, great-great-great-granddaughter of Manuel Rodríguez Objío

See also 
 Six Years' War

References 

1838 births
1871 deaths
19th-century newspaper founders
19th-century Dominican Republic poets
19th-century Dominican Republic politicians
Candidates for President of the Dominican Republic
Dominican Republic male poets
Dominican Republic military personnel
Dominican Republic newspaper founders
Education ministers of the Dominican Republic
Foreign ministers of the Dominican Republic
Justice ministers of the Dominican Republic
Members of the Chamber of Deputies of the Dominican Republic
White Dominicans